Lithuania competed at the 2008 European Track Championships in Pruszków, Poland, from 3 September to 7 September 2008. Lithuania competed in 14 of the 34 events.

List of medalists

Results

Elite

Omnium

Source

Under-23

Time trial

Individual Pursuit

Scratch

Points race

Junior

Time trial

Individual Pursuit

Team Pursuit

Scratch

Points race

See also

  Belarus at the 2008 UEC European Track Championships
  Great Britain at the 2008 UEC European Track Championships
  Netherlands at the 2008 UEC European Track Championships

References

2008 in Lithuanian sport
Nations at the 2008 UEC European Track Championships
Lithuania at cycling events